Kahlua may refer to:

 Kahlúa, a Mexican coffee-flavored liqueur
 Kahlua (software), an implementation of the Lua programming language for Java ME

See also
 Kailua (disambiguation)